Hongje Station is a rapid transit station on Seoul Subway Line 3 in Seodaemun-gu, Seoul.

Station layout

References 

Seoul Metropolitan Subway stations
Metro stations in Seodaemun District
Seoul Subway Line 3
Railway stations in South Korea opened in 1985